Hatano Norinao (November 13, 1850 – August 29, 1922) was Grand Chamberlain of Japan (1912). He was born in Saga Prefecture. He was recipient of the Order of the Sacred Treasure (3rd class, 1899; 1st class, 1906), the Order of the Rising Sun (December 1, 1915) and the Victory Medal for World War I (November 10, 1915).

References

Bibliography
 霞会館華族家系大成編輯委員会『平成新修旧華族家系大成』（霞会館、1996年）
 衆議院・参議院編『議会制度七十年史』（大蔵省印刷局、1962年）

External links
波多野敬直経歴

1850 births
1922 deaths
People from Saga Prefecture
Recipients of the Order of the Sacred Treasure, 1st class
Grand Cordons of the Order of the Rising Sun
Recipients of the Order of the Rising Sun with Paulownia Flowers